Apil-Sin was an Amorite King of the First Dynasty of Babylon (the Amorite Dynasty). He possibly(see Chronology of the ancient Near East) reigned c. 1767–1749 BC.

Apil-Sin was the grandfather of Hammurabi, who significantly expanded the Babylonian kingdom. Little is known of the details of Apil-Sin or his reign as king of Babylon; in fact, there are no surviving references to his claiming to be king of the city state. The absence of records is often used by scholars as evidence that at this time Babylon was still a new and minor city-state, and that Apil-Sin's power and influence were much smaller than that of his grandson, Hammurabi.

See also

Babylonia

References

18th-century BC Babylonian kings
First dynasty of Babylon